In cricket, a five-wicket haul (also known as a "fifer") refers to a bowler taking five or more wickets in a single innings. This is regarded as a notable achievement, and  only 48 bowlers have taken 15 or more five-wicket hauls at the international level. A right-arm off break bowler, Harbhajan Singh has taken 417 wickets in Test, 269 wickets in One Day International (ODI) and 25 wickets in Twenty20 International (T20I) matches for India. He has the second-highest number of five-wicket hauls (28) in international cricketnext to Anil Kumbleamong Indian cricketers and the eleventh among overall.

Harbhajan made his Test debut against Australia in 1998. His first five-wicket haul came against the same team during the second Test of the 2000–01 series at Eden Gardens. His six wickets for 73 runs in the second innings of the match raised his tally to thirteen wickets in the match; his performance was instrumental in India winning the match after being forced to follow-on. In the third Test of the series, he claimed fifteen wickets for 217 runs, including career-best figures of eight wickets for 84 runs. The majority of his five-wicket hauls in Test cricketseven out of his twenty-fivehave come against Australia.

Harbhajan's first five-wicket haul in ODIs came against England in 2002, four years after he made his debut. He took five wickets for 43 runs in the match which India lost. His best figures of five wickets for 31 runs came against the same team in 2006. Although Harbhajan made his first T20I appearance in 2006, he has yet to take a five-wicket haul in the format . His figures of four wickets for 12 runs against England in 2012 remain his best in T20Is.

Key

Tests

ODIs

Notes

References

Indian cricket lists
Harbhajan Singh